The 1964–65 season was Fussball Club Basel 1893's 71st season in their existence. It was their 19th consecutive season in the top flight of Swiss football after their promotion in the 1945–46 season. They played their home games either in their old Landhof Stadium or in their new St. Jakob Stadium. Lucien Schmidlin was club chairman for the third consecutive year.

Overview

Pre-season
The Czechoslovakian manager Jiří Sobotka was the Basel team manager at this time, it was his fourth year as manager of the team. The Czechoslovakian manager Jiří Sobotka was the Basel team manager at this time, it was his fourth year as manager of the team. There were only a few changes in the squad. Kurt Stettler moved on to Young Fellows Zürich, René Burri to Cantonal Neuchatel and Bruno Gatti to Biel-Bienne. During the winter break Heinz Blumer moved on to Chiasso. In the other direction German striker Heinz Sartor joined from Südwest Ludwigshafen, Werner Decker joined from local team Concordia Basel and Bruno Gabrieli from Nordstern Basel. Basel played a total of 51 matches un this season. 26 of these were in the domestic league, five were in the Swiss Cup, four matches were in the Inter-Cities Fairs Cup and 16 were friendly matches. Of these 16 test games eight were won, four drawn and four were lost.

Hans Weber
A sad note to be noted is, on 26 December 1964 FCB played against Grasshoppers Zürich in the quarter-finals of the Swiss Cup. They decided the match 3–1 for themselves in overtime, Hans Weber had scored the equaliser two minutes before the end of the regular time. This was to be the very last match for the popular Basler captain of that time Hans Weber, because just seven weeks later he died of cancer. Between his first appearance in 1949 and his death in February 1965 he made 281 appearances for Basel scoring 48 goals. On 31 March 1965 Basel played a match against the Swiss national team as Hans Weber memorial. 17,000 people came to pay their respect and to watch the game. Frigerio, Gabrieli and Baumann scored the goals as Basel won 3–0.

Domestic league
Fourteen teams contested the 1964–65 Nationalliga A, these were the top 12 teams from the previous season 1963–64 and the two newly promoted teams Lugano and Bellinzona. Basel ended the championship with eleven wins and five draws in their 26 matches, and finished in eighth position with 27 points. They scored 44 goals and conceded 54. For Basel it was a mediocre season with some very unusual and high scoring results, 5–4 at home against Grasshopper Club, 4–3 at home against Biel-Bienne and a 3–3 draw at home against the new champions Lausanne-Sport after a three goal lead before half time. There were also some high scoring defeats, 1–5 away against Grenchen, 0–6 away against Sion, 0–6 away against La Chaux-de-Fonds and a 1–6 away in the last game of the season against Young Boys. Roberto Frigerio was the team's top goal scorer with 13 goals. Lausanne Sports won the championship with 36 points and thus qualified for the following year's 1965–66 European Cup.

Swiss Cup
In the Swiss Cup Basel started in the round of 64, 10 October 1964, with a home win against lower classed Locarno. In the next round they played at home against Bern which was won 3–1 and, consequently, drawn at home against Lasuanne Sports in the round of 16 which ended in a 3–2 victory. After the quarter-final against Grasshoppers Zürich (mentioned above) Basel were drawn at home again for the semi-final. This game was against Sion and was played on 7 March 1965. Basel were defeated 2–3 and Sion continued to the final which they won against Servette.

Inter-Cities Fairs Cup
Basel were qualified for the 1964–65 Inter-Cities Fairs Cup and in the first round they played CA Spora Luxembourg. A 2–0 home win and a 0–1 away defeat was enough to take them through to the second round. But two defeats against Strasbourg ended their Fairs Cup competition.

Players 
The following is the list of the Basel first team squad during the 1964–65 season. The list includes players that were in the squad on the day that the Nationalliga A season started on 23 August 1964 but subsequently left the club after that date.

 
 
 

 

 
 
 
 

 
 

 

 
 
 

Players who left the squad

Results 

Legend

Friendly matches

Pre and mid-season

Winter break and mid-season

Nationalliga A

League matches

League table

Swiss Cup

Inter-Cities Fairs Cup

First Round

Basel won 2–1 on aggregate.

Second round

Strasbourg won 6–2 on aggregate.

See also
 History of FC Basel
 List of FC Basel players
 List of FC Basel seasons

References

Notes

Sources
 Rotblau: Jahrbuch Saison 2014/2015. Publisher: FC Basel Marketing AG. 
 Die ersten 125 Jahre. Publisher: Josef Zindel im Friedrich Reinhardt Verlag, Basel. 
 FCB team 1964–65 at fcb-archiv.ch
 Switzerland 1964–65 at RSSSF
 Fairs' Cup 1964-65 at RSSSF

External links
 FC Basel official site

FC Basel seasons
Basel